R. & W. Hawthorn, Leslie and Company, Limited, usually referred to as Hawthorn Leslie, was a shipbuilder and locomotive manufacturer. The company was founded on Tyneside in 1886 and ceased building ships in 1982.

History

The company was formed by the merger of the shipbuilder A. Leslie and Company in Hebburn with the locomotive works of R and W Hawthorn at St. Peter's in Newcastle upon Tyne in 1886. The company displaced its locomotive manufacturing interests in 1937 to Robert Stephenson and Company, which became Robert Stephenson and Hawthorns Ltd.

Perhaps the most famous ship built by the Company was HMS Kelly, launched in 1938 and commanded by Lord Louis Mountbatten. In 1954, the shipbuilding and marine engine activities were put into separate subsidiaries, Hawthorn Leslie (Shipbuilders) Ltd. and Hawthorn Leslie (Engineers) Ltd. In 1968 the Company's shipbuilding interests were merged with that of Swan Hunter and the Vickers Naval Yard to create Swan Hunter & Tyne Shipbuilders.

The company's shipbuilding and marine engineering interests were both nationalised and subsumed with British Shipbuilders in 1977; in 1979 its engine business was merged with George Clark & NEM, which had also been nationalised, to form Clark Hawthorn.

The company's main shipbuilding yard at Hebburn closed in 1982, was sold to Cammell Laird and then acquired by A&P Group in 2001 but now lies derelict. The Company itself, deprived of its main activity, diversified into telephones. In March 1993, Vodafone made a bid for the Company which by then had become a mobile phone air time reseller.

The Hawthorn Leslie building still standing in Hebburn has been the target of numerous arson attacks in recent years.  This, combined with the presence of asbestos in the brickwork and the ease of access to children, has led to repeated calls from Hebburn residents and councillors for the building to be demolished.

Locomotives
After the merger the locomotive side continued manufacturing for main line, light and industrial railways, including a large number built for export, usually to the designs of the Crown Agents.

Designs
Steam
The company manufactured locomotives to order for main line companies. Four  locomotives were supplied to the Metropolitan Railway between 1896 and 1901. In 1915, F. G. Smith of the Highland Railway ordered six s to his own designs. However they were rejected by that railway as being too heavy, they were taken over by the Caledonian Railway. The London and North Eastern Railway ordered a batch of Great Central designed locomotives from the Company in 1925/6.

It was produced for the Chicago World's Fair of 1893 but could not produce sufficient steam to compete effectively with the American products.

The company later had a number of standard designs including s and fireless locomotives.

 Two  locomotives were supplied to the Kent and East Sussex Railway in 1899. Owned by the Rother Valley Railway and/or the Kent & East Sussex Light Railway.

 

Hawthorn Leslie  Built 1906, and became K&ESR, No. 4 and named "Hecate," The locomotive was an outside cylindered 0-8-0 side tank engine with a short wheelbase and flangeless driven wheels to cope with the sharp curves expected on the new line. With 16 in by 24 in cylinders and 4 ft 3 in diameter driving wheels, its tractive effort was 16,385 lb, more than twice that of the line's other locomotives and sufficient to take trains over the 1 in 40 gradients of the North Downs crossing. The engine was painted dark blue and lined in red, with a copper cap to the chimney and a polished brass dome. Eventually, in 1932 they exchanged "Hecate" for an older LSWR "Saddleback" and two spare boilers from the Southern Railway (SR). This was a good bargain on the SR's part, as they repainted "Hecate" (keeping the name), numbered it 949, and sent it to Nine Elms, where it worked almost daily on shunting duties until eventual scrapping in 1950.
 
 Two Hawthorn Leslie  locomotives were supplied to the Shropshire and Montgomeryshire Railway in 1911. Named Pyramus and Thisbe, these seem not to have been a success, and soon departed, one of them to the Longmoor Military Railway in Hampshire.

Hawthorn Leslie built 27, A class  steam tank locomotives designed by J. Cameron and introduced to the Taff Vale Railway in 1914.

 Hawthorn Leslie built two  locomotives for the Port of London Authority docks railway in 1922. Works numbers 3529 and 3530.

Diesel
Hawthorn Leslie, in collaboration with the English Electric Company, built diesel shunting locomotives for the London, Midland and Scottish Railway in the 1930s. This design formed the basis for the later British Rail Class 08 diesel shunter.

Electric

Hawthorn Leslie, and its successor Robert Stephenson and Hawthorns, built four electric locomotives for Kearsley power station between 1928 and 1946 and three of these still exist.  No. 2 has been converted to battery operation and is in use at Heysham nuclear power station.  Nos. 1 and 3 are preserved, see below.

Preserved locomotives

Steam

28 Hawthorn Leslie Tank Engines are in preservation today:

Hawthorn Leslie  Wn2450 Built 1899 Commander B (formerly Newcastle) awaiting overhaul at the Hollycombe Steam Collection
Hawthorn Leslie  Wn2491 Built 1901 Henry at the Barrow Hill Engine Shed
Hawthorn Leslie  Wn2711 Built 1907 Cyclops  at the Tanfield Railway
Hawthorn Leslie  Wn2780 Built 1909 Asbestos (On display) at the Chasewater Railway
Hawthorn Leslie  Wn2800 Built 1909 Met
Hawthorn Leslie  Wn2859 Built 1911 No.2 Ex Keighley Corporation Gas Dept.  at the Tanfield Railway
Hawthorn Leslie  Wn2928 Built 1912 Pony also known as Achilles at the Chatham Historic Dockyard
Hawthorn Leslie  Wn2988 Built 1913 Wallaby at the Illawarra Light Railway Museum NSW
Hawthorn Leslie  Wn3056 Built 1914 NCB No.14 at the Tanfield Railway
Hawthorn Leslie  Wn3135 Built 1915 Invincible 37 at the Isle of Wight Steam Railway
Hawthorn Leslie  Wn3138 Built 1915 Holwell No.14 Dismantled, awaiting restoration. Ex Goodman Bros, at the Rutland Railway Museum 
Hawthorn Leslie  Wn3240 Built 1917 Beatty No.139 at the Telford Steam Railway
Hawthorn Leslie  Wn3437 Built 1919 Isabel operational at the Epping Ongar Railway
Hawthorn Leslie  Wn3513 Built 1927 NCB STAGSHAW at the Telford Steam Railway
Hawthorn Leslie  Wn3574 Built 1923 Burra operational at the Illawarra Light Railway Museum NSW
Hawthorn Leslie Wn3575 Built 1923 GLASSHOUGHTON No.3 at the Tanfield Railway
Hawthorn Leslie  Wn3581 Built 1924 Thompson & Evershed No. 3 Foxfield Railway
Hawthorn Leslie  Wn3640 Built 1926 Lord King at the SRPS Bo'ness and Kinneil Railway
Hawthorn Leslie  Wn3732 Built 1928 No.13 or The Barra at the Tanfield Railway
Hawthorn Leslie  Wn3715 Built 1928 Associated Portland Cement at Swanscombe No.1 at the Colne Valley Railway
Hawthorn Leslie  Wn3717 Built 1928 Associated Portland Cement at Swanscombe  No.3 at the Buckinghamshire Railway Centre
Hawthorn Leslie  Wn3718 Built 1928 Associated Portland Cement at Swanscombe  No.4 at the Buckinghamshire Railway Centre
Hawthorn Leslie  Wn3799 Built 1935 Penicuik at the Aln Valley Railway
Hawthorn Leslie  Wn3827 Built 1934 ex-Corby Iron & Steel Works No. 14 at the East Carlton Country Park
Hawthorn Leslie  Wn3837 Built 1934 ex-Corby Iron & Steel Works No. 16 at the Epping Ongar Railway 
Hawthorn Leslie  Wn3860 Built 1935 Associated Portland Cement Manufacturers, Swanscombe, No.6 at the Middleton Railway
Hawthorn Leslie  Wn3865 Built 1936 Singapore Ex HM Dockyards Chatham, at the Rutland Railway Museum
Hawthorn Leslie  Wn3931 Built 1938 Linda Returned to steam in May 2015. Cambrian Heritage Railways

Fireless
Hawthorn Leslie  Wn3746 Built 1929 HUNCOAT No.3 at the Tanfield Railway
Hawthorn Leslie  Wn3858 Built 1935 Tugela Colenso - Municipal Offices, SA/

Diesel
Hawthorn Leslie  Wn???? Built 1935 LMS diesel shunter no. 7069 at the Berkeley Vale Railway

Electric
Two of the Kearsley power station locomotives (see above) are preserved.  No. 1 at the Electric Railway Museum, Warwickshire and no. 3 at the Tanfield Railway.

Shipbuilding
Ships built by Hawthorn Leslie included:

Aircraft Carriers

Cruisers

Frigates

Destroyers

Royal Fleet Auxiliary

 Merchant ships

SS Alagoar 

SS Barneson
MV Beacon Grange

SS Cass

  

SS Suntrap

See also
 List of shipbuilders and shipyards
 :Category:Hawthorn Leslie and Company locomotives

References

Further reading

External links
 Photographs from Urban Exploration of the yard in 2007

Locomotive manufacturers of the United Kingdom
Defunct shipbuilding companies of the United Kingdom
British companies established in 1886
British Shipbuilders